The Trincoll Journal (Trincoll Journal) is a WebZine.  It was produced by a student group at Trinity College in Hartford, Connecticut, United States from 1992 until it became defunct in the spring of 2000.  Most of its content is still available via the Trinity College website.

Widely cited as one of the first web based magazines, the Trincoll Journal began published on the web in November 1993. Prior to 1993 the Journal was published in Hypercard format and distributed via FTP archives.

Founders 
 Peter Adams
 Paul Tedesco
 Tom Elia

Former Staff 
 Frank Sikernitsky

References

External links
Trincoll Journal

Defunct magazines published in the United States
Magazines established in 1992
Magazines disestablished in 2000
Magazines published in Connecticut
Mass media in Hartford, Connecticut
Online magazines published in the United States
Student magazines published in the United States
Trinity College (Connecticut)